John Hills (c. 1960 – 1 June 2014) was a British horse trainer specializing in Flat racing. Hills was the son of Barry Hills and brother of jockeys Michael Hills and Richard Hills.

Hills began as an amateur jockey, riding the winners of 21 races, and worked for trainers Harry Thomson Jones, Edward O'Grady and John Gosden. He also worked for his father, Barry, and became a trainer himself in 1987. During his career, Hills trained around 700 
winners.

Major wins
 Germany 
 Aral-Pokal – Wind In Her Hair (1995)

References

2014 deaths
British racehorse trainers
Year of birth uncertain
1960s births